Odai Yusuf Ismaeel Al-Saify is a Jordanian footballer who plays for Qadsia SC and the Jordan national football team.

Club career
Al-Saify started his career playing for Shabab Al-Ordon, in which he was loaned out to Al-Dhafra in the United Arab Emirates. Then he joined Skoda Xanthi in Greece, Alki Larnaca in Cyprus, and Al-Salmiya, Qadsia SC and Al-Nasr in Kuwait.

International career
Al-Saify played 118 international matches for Jordan, in which he participated in the 2011 AFC Asian Cup and 2015 AFC Asian Cup. On 12 November 2020, he returned to play for his national team after three years of absence.

Personal life
Odai is married to Nour Al-Saify and has four children; a daughter named Alma and three sons named Zaid, Yousef and Hashem.

International goals

With U-23

With Senior Team
Scores and results list Jordan's goal tally first.

See also
 List of men's footballers with 100 or more international caps

References

External links
 
 
 
 
  

1986 births
Living people
Jordanian footballers
Jordanian people of Palestinian descent
Jordan international footballers
Xanthi F.C. players
Alki Larnaca FC players
Jordanian expatriate sportspeople in the United Arab Emirates
Super League Greece players
Cypriot First Division players
Sportspeople from Amman
Jordanian expatriate footballers
Expatriate footballers in the United Arab Emirates
Expatriate footballers in Cyprus
2011 AFC Asian Cup players
2015 AFC Asian Cup players
Expatriate footballers in Greece
Jordanian expatriate sportspeople in Kuwait
Expatriate footballers in Kuwait
Association football forwards
Footballers at the 2006 Asian Games
Sportspeople from Kuwait City
Al Salmiya SC players
Al Dhafra FC players
Al-Nasr SC (Kuwait) players
UAE Pro League players
FIFA Century Club
Asian Games competitors for Jordan